Seamie O’Dowd is an Irish musician.

Biography 
Seamie O Dowd is a guitarist, singer, and songwriter who also plays fiddle, harmonica, mandolin, and a number of other instruments.

He has travelled worldwide playing music and has shared stages and played with many great musicians and bands including the following;
Mairtin O'Connor, Cathal Hayden, Christy Moore, Declan Synott, The Chieftains, Jimmy Higgins, Tommy Emmanuel, Dervish, Steve Wickham, Matt Molloy, Liam O' Flynn, Thom Moore, Dick Gaughan, Cathy Jordan, Rick Epping, Kieran Quinn, John Joe Kelly, Martin Hayes, Dennis Cahill and Cathal Roche.

His experience also includes recording production, teaching and more recently, film soundtrack work, and encompasses solo performance as well as extensive work with bands and small groups as both a member and a session musician...

References

External links
http://www.seamieodowd.net

Irish musicians
Living people
Year of birth missing (living people)

da:Irsk folkemusik
de:Irish Folk
fr:Musique traditionnelle irlandaise
nl:Ierse folk
no:Irsk folkemusikk